Frédéric Chopin's Impromptu No. 1 in A major, Op. 29 was composed in 1837.

Music
The Impromptu is in ternary form (ABA), the middle being in the key of F minor. A perpetuum mobile in triplets accompanies the piece.

In popular culture
In George du Maurier's novel Trilby, the title character, a singer who can perform only under the influence of hypnosis, performs the Impromptu in A major as a wordless vocalise to end her concerts.

References

External links
 Hear the performance and find more information on the Impromptu No. 1  at The Chopin Project
 

Compositions by Frédéric Chopin
Compositions for solo piano
1837 compositions
Compositions in A-flat major

fr:Impromptu nº 1 de Chopin